Cashen Noel Keon Fitzgerald (16 May 1921 – 23 June 1992) was an Australian rules footballer who played with Hawthorn in the Victorian Football League (VFL).

Notes

External links 

1921 births
1992 deaths
Australian rules footballers from Victoria (Australia)
Hawthorn Football Club players